Hermann Gotthilf Ferdinand Boettcher (12 November 1866 – 7 May 1935) was a German stage and film actor.

Selected filmography
 The Man of Action (1919)
 The Swabian Maiden (1919)
 Madame Récamier (1920)
 The Big Light (1920)
 Four Around a Woman (1921)
 The Secret of Bombay (1921)
 Driving Force (1921)
 Bigamy (1922)
 The Homecoming of Odysseus (1922)
 The Girl from Capri (1924)
 By Order of Pompadour (1924)
 The Mistress of Monbijou (1924)
 The Prince and the Maid (1924)
 Anne-Liese of Dessau (1925)
 Countess Ironing-Maid (1926)
 The Bohemian Dancer (1926)
 Princess Olala (1928)
 Immorality (1928)
 My Heart is a Jazz Band (1929)
 Napoleon at Saint Helena (1929)
 Taxi at Midnight (1930)
 Police Spy 77 (1930)
 Retreat on the Rhine (1930)
 Hans in Every Street (1930)
 Marriage in Name Only (1930)
 The Dancer of Sanssouci (1932)

References

Bibliography
 Hardt, Ursula. From Caligari to California: Erich Pommer's life in the International Film Wars. Berghahn Books, 1996.

External links

1866 births
1935 deaths
German male stage actors
German male film actors
German male silent film actors
20th-century German male actors
Actors from Königsberg